Bitter orange, Sour Orange, Seville orange, bigarade orange, or marmalade orange is the citrus tree Citrus × aurantium and its fruit. It is native to Southeast Asia and has been spread by humans to many parts of the world. It is probably a cross between the pomelo, Citrus maxima, and the mandarin orange, Citrus reticulata.

History
Wild trees are found near small streams in generally secluded and wooded parts of Florida and the Bahamas after it was introduced to the area from Spain, where it had been introduced and cultivated heavily beginning in the 10th century by the Moors.

Identification
Citrus × aurantium can be identified through its orange fruit with a distinctly bitter or sour taste. The tree has alternate simple leaves and thorns on its petiole.

Usage
Many varieties of bitter orange are used for their essential oil, and are found in perfume, used as a flavoring or as a solvent, and also for consumption. The Seville orange variety is used in the production of marmalade and also used to make French bigarade.

Bitter orange is also employed in herbal medicine as a stimulant and appetite suppressant, due to its active ingredient, synephrine. Bitter orange supplements have been linked to a number of serious side effects and deaths, and consumer groups advocate that people avoid using the fruit medically. Whether bitter orange affects medical conditions of heart and cardiovascular organs, by itself or in formulae with other substances, is inconclusive. Standard reference materials are released concerning the properties in bitter orange by the National Institute of Standards and Technology for ground fruit, extract, and solid oral dosage form, along with those packaged together into one item.

Varieties

The only scientifically accepted subspecies are Citrus × aurantium f. aurantium and Citrus × aurantium f. deliciosa .

 Citrus × aurantium subsp. amara is a spiny evergreen tree native to southern Vietnam, and widely cultivated. It is used as grafting stock for citrus trees, in marmalade, and in liqueur such as triple sec, Grand Marnier, and Curaçao. It is also cultivated for the essential oil expressed from the fruit, and for neroli oil and orange flower water, which are distilled from the flowers.
 Citrus × aurantium var. myrtifolia is sometimes considered a separate species, Citrus myrtifolia, the myrtle-leaved orange. The 'Chinotto' cultivar is used to make the Italian soda beverage also called Chinotto. 
 Citrus × aurantium var. daidai, daidai, is used in Chinese medicine and Japanese New Year celebrations. The aromatic flowers are added to tea.
 Citrus × aurantium subsp. currassuviencis, laraha, grows on the Caribbean island of Curaçao. The dried peels are used in the creation of Curaçao liqueur.

Related species
 Citrus bergamia, the Bergamot orange, is probably a bitter orange and limetta hybrid; it is cultivated in Italy for the production of bergamot oil, a component of many brands of perfume and tea, especially Earl Grey tea.

Cooking
While the raw pulp is not edible, bitter orange is widely used in cooking.

The Seville orange (the usual name in this context) is prized for making British orange marmalade, being higher in pectin than the sweet orange, and therefore giving a better set and a higher yield.  Once a year, oranges of this variety are collected from trees in Seville and shipped to Britain to be used in marmalade. However, the fruit is rarely consumed locally in Andalusia. This reflects the historic Atlantic trading relationship with Portugal and Spain; the earliest recipe for 'marmelat of oranges' dates from 1677.

Bitter orange—bigarade—was used in all early recipes for duck à l'orange, originally called canard à la bigarade.

It is also used in compotes and for orange-flavored liqueurs.  The peel can be used in the production of bitters.  The unripe fruit, called narthangai, is commonly used in Southern Indian cuisine, especially in Tamil cuisine. It is pickled by cutting it into spirals or small wedges and stuffing it with salt.  The pickle is usually consumed with yoghurt rice called thayir sadam.  The fresh fruit is also used frequently in pachadis.

The Belgian Witbier (white beer) is often spiced with the peel of the bitter orange.

In Finland and Sweden, bitter orange peel is used in dried, ground form (called pomeranssi in Finnish, pomerans in Swedish) in gingerbread (pepparkakor), some Christmas bread, and mämmi. In Denmark, the candied peel (Danish pomeransskal) is used in various desserts and cakes like Christmas Cake (julekage) and Brown Cake (brunekager).  It is also used in the Nordic glögi.

In Greece and Cyprus, the nerántzi or κιτρομηλο, respectively, is one of the most prized fruits used for spoon sweets, and the C. aurantium tree (nerantziá or kitromiliá) is a popular ornamental tree.  In Albania as well, nerënxa or portokalli i hidhur is used commonly in spoon sweets.

In Malta, bitter oranges are known as larinġ tal-bakkaljaw, and are used for marmalade and as root-stock for other citrus trees.  The Maltese soft drink Kinnie is also made from bitter oranges.

In Turkey, juice of the ripe fruits can be used as salad dressing, especially in Çukurova region. However, in Iraqi cuisine, a bitter orange or raranj in Iraqi is used to complement dishes such as charred fish (samak or simach maskouf, tomato stew morgat tamata, qeema, a dish that has the same ingredients as an Iraqi tomato stew with the addition of minced meat, boiled chickpeas lablabi, salads, as a dressing, and on essentially any dish one might desire to accompany bitter orange. Iraqis also consume it as a citrus fruit or juice it to make bitter orange juice aseer raranj. Throughout Iran (where the fruit is commonly known as narenj), the juice is popularly used as a salad dressing, souring agent in stews and pickles or as a marinade. The blossoms are collected fresh to make a prized sweet-smelling aromatic jam (bitter orange blossom jam, morabba bahar-narenj), or added to brewing tea.

In the Americas, the juice from the ripe fruit is used as a marinade for meat in Nicaraguan, Cuban, Dominican, and Haitian cooking, as it is in Peruvian ceviche. In Yucatán (Mexico), it is a main ingredient of the cochinita pibil. In Cuba, a traditional Christmas time dessert is made with the peel of the bitter orange cooked in syrup and eaten with cheese and buñuelos. In Suriname, its juice is also used in the well-known dish pom.

Herbal stimulant

The extract of bitter orange (and bitter orange peel) has been marketed as dietary supplement purported to act as a weight-loss aid and appetite suppressant.  Bitter orange contains the tyramine metabolites N-methyltyramine, octopamine, and synephrine, substances similar to epinephrine, which act on the α1 adrenergic receptor to constrict blood vessels and increase blood pressure and heart rate. Several low-quality clinical trials have had results of p-synephrine (alone or in combination with caffeine or some other substances) increasing weight loss slightly.

Similarities to ephedra
Following bans on the herbal stimulant ephedra in the U.S., Canada, and elsewhere, bitter orange has been substituted into "ephedra-free" herbal weight-loss products by dietary supplement manufacturers. Like most dietary supplement ingredients, bitter orange has not undergone formal safety testing, but it is believed to cause the same spectrum of adverse events (harmful side effects) as ephedra. The U.S. National Center for Complementary and Integrative Health found, "currently little evidence [shows] that bitter orange is safer to use than ephedra."

Case reports have linked bitter orange supplements to strokes, angina, and ischemic colitis. Following an incident in which a healthy young man suffered a heart attack linked to bitter orange, a case study found that dietary supplement manufacturers had replaced ephedra with its analogs from bitter orange.

Drug interactions
Bitter orange may have serious interactions with drugs such as Statins (to lower cholesterol), nifedipines (to lower blood pressure), some anti-anxiety drugs, some antihistamines, etc. in a similar way to the effect of grapefruit (see grapefruit–drug interactions).

Other uses
This orange is used as a rootstock in groves of sweet orange. The fruit and leaves make lather and can be used as soap. The hard, white or light-yellow wood is used in woodworking and made into baseball bats in Cuba.

References

External links
 
 
 Bitter Orange: Information from the National Center for Complementary and Integrative Health
 Bitter Orange List of Chemicals (Dr. Duke's Databases)

Dietary supplements
Herbal and fungal stimulants
Medicinal plants
Oranges (fruit)
Plants described in 1753
Citrus hybrids